CoppaFeel! is a breast cancer awareness charity, based in London. The charity focuses on promoting early detection of breast cancer, by encouraging women under 30 to regularly check their breasts.

CoppaFeel! is a charity partner of Cosmopolitan magazine.

History 

CoppaFeel! was founded in 2009 by twin sisters Kristin and Maren Hallenga, after Kristin was diagnosed with breast cancer at the age of 23. Because of a late diagnosis, Kristin Hallenga lives with stage four breast cancer. Despite Hallenga's having a family history of cancer, doctors originally dismissed a tumor on Kristin's breast as “hormonal”.

Driven by the difficult experience, Kristin and Maren, devoted themselves to educating young women about the dangers of late diagnosis, and launched CoppaFeel! at Beach Break Live in 2009.

Mission and values 

"I want everyone to know that cancer doesn’t conform to the over-40s rule we try to impose on it; and that getting to know your boobs from a young age, and making checking them regularly a habit of a lifetime you could save your life one day."

- Kristin Hallenga.

"...to live in a world where all breast cancers are diagnosed at the earliest stage possible, at which treatments are more effective and survival rates are higher."

- CoppaFeel!'s vision statement.

Much of their awareness campaigns are based on the principle that the more that an individual is aware of their own breasts, the more likely they are to spot a change – should one occur. Most of their awareness work is carried out at universities, music festivals, schools and work places and via national awareness campaigns around the UK. CoppaFeel!'s ambassadors are called 'the Boobettes', who are young women that have all had the disease at a young age.

Campaigns 

Over the past few years, CoppaFeel! have instigated several high-profile breast cancer awareness campaigns.

In summer 2014 they launched their ‘What Normal Feels Like’ campaign, which seeks to reclaim the language and imagery associated with breasts. Hundreds of women have submitted pictures of their breasts, along with a descriptive word such as “wibbly” or “springy”, which have been used in a series of advertisements designed to normalise and desexualise female breasts.

CoppaFeel! have also run a ‘Cheknominate’ campaign, which was their “healthier” take on the Neknominate craze. Cheknominate encouraged people to record themselves checking their breasts before nominating a friend to do the same. The Huffington Post were supportive of the campaign, and encouraged their readers to try to get the hashtag #Cheknominate trending on social media.

Media coverage 

Many of Coppafeel!’s publicity campaigns have involved the use of giant inflatable ‘boob’ costumes.

CoppaFeel! gained widespread media coverage when they a decorated The Angel of the North with a ‘boob hijack’ sticker.

In 2015 CoppaFeel! founder Kristin Hallenga was profiled in Kris: Dying to Live, a documentary that covered her battle with terminal breast cancer. She also played herself in The C Word, a BBC One adaptation of the book by cancer blogger Lisa Lynch.

Festifeel 

CoppaFeel! host the annual music festival, Festifeel, helping to raise money for breast cancer awareness. It describes itself as "Britain's only boutique music festival with boobs in mind!".

Celebrity support 

Their innovative fundraising activities have received widespread support from celebrities including Fearne Cotton, Russell Howard, Newton Faulkner, Lorraine Kelly and Danni Minogue.

Radio presenters Greg James and Dermot O'Leary both ran the 2013 Bath Half Marathon, wearing giant inflatable ‘boobs’, in support of CoppaFeel!

Gavin & Stacey star Mathew Horne appeared in a cinema campaign for Coppafeel!, encouraging viewers to check out their boobs before the film started.

In September 2012 Mel B posed topless in a Coppafeel! advert in Cosmopolitan magazine, ahead of breast cancer awareness month. The advert's risqué nature received mass-media coverage.

References

External links 

Charity fundraisers